Jay Kumar Rai (also Jaya Kumar Rai) is a Nepali communist politician and a member of the House of Representatives of the federal parliament of Nepal. He won his seat from Sunsari-1 constituency representing CPN UML of the left alliance. This is the first time he has been elected to parliament. He defeated his nearest rival Ashok Kumar Rai, acquiring more than double the votes received by the latter. He received 44,528 votes to Ashok Rai's 22,123.

He is a member of the House Finance Committee and represents Nepal Communist Party in the parliament.

References

Living people
Nepal MPs 2017–2022
Nepal Communist Party (NCP) politicians
Communist Party of Nepal (Unified Marxist–Leninist) politicians
1968 births